is a naturally occurring, granular clay-like mineral used as soil for bonsai trees and other container-grown plants. It is surface-mined, immediately sifted and bagged, and supplied in various grades; the deeper-mined grade are  somewhat harder and more useful in horticulture than the more softer, shallow-mined grades. Akadama may also act as one component of growing medium when combined with other elements such as sand, composted bark, peat, or crushed lava. The color darkens when moist which can help the grower determine when to water a tree. 

While akadama is more costly than alternative soil components, it is prized by many growers for its ability to retain water and nutrients while still providing porosity and free drainage. For all of its qualities, many bonsai growers consider the cost of akadama prohibitive or unnecessary. Still other growers claim that when subjected to cold and wet climates, the granules progressively break down into smaller particles that inhibit drainage, an unwanted characteristic of bonsai soil. This problem can be avoided either by incorporating sand or grit in the soil mix, or by using the deeper-mined, harder grades.

Origin 
Due to volcanic activity, Japan enjoys rich volcanic resources. After volcanic eruptions, volcanic rocks and pumice accumulate near the volcano. Several horticultural products based on these materials have been developed in Japan, two of which are the Akadama and kanuma soils.

Size and components 
Sizes vary between companies
Fine       :1-3mm
Small      :4-7ｍｍ
Medium     :7-14ｍｍ
Large      :15-25ｍｍ

Components include silicon dioxide SiO2 42.7%, calcium oxide CaO 0.98%, magnesium oxide  MgO 2.5%, manganese oxide MnO 0.15%, iron oxide Fe2O3 8.4%, and aluminium oxide Al2O3 25.1%.

Akadama has a pH of 6.9 and conductivity of 0.052 ms/cm.

Uses 
Akadama is used in the cultivation of plants. It can be used alone or mixed in as an amendment to other soil substrates such as lava rock, pumice, stone, peat moss, bark, etc. It is supplied in various sizes including "Shohin" (less than 1/16 inch), "Small" (1/16 inch to 1/4 inch), and "Medium" (1/4 inch to 1/2 inch). All sizes are suitable for many sorts of potted plants, but in particular, shohin or small is the  preferred choice for cactus and succulent plants.

References

Bonsai
Plant nutrition
Types of soil